Jowzargan (also Romanized as Jowzargān; also known as Dzhadzhargan, Faizābād, Jajargān, Joojarakan, Jowjerkān, and Jūjergān) is a village in Chavarzaq Rural District, Chavarzaq District, Tarom County, Zanjan Province, Iran. At the 2006 census, its population was 96, in 23 families.

References 

Populated places in Tarom County